Robyn Njegovan (born July 6, 1994) is a Canadian retired curler from Winnipeg, Manitoba.

Career
Njegovan won the 2015 Manitoba Junior provincial championship playing third for the Beth Peterson rink with Melissa Gordon at second and Breanne Yozenko at lead. At the 2015 Canadian Junior Curling Championships, they finished in fifth place with a 6–4 record. The following season, Team Peterson began competing on the World Curling Tour and finished runner-up at the 2015 Mother Club Fall Curling Classic. As Peterson and Yozenko aged out of juniors, Njegovan and Gordon brought on Abby Ackland to skip their team at the Manitoba Junior championship with Sara Oliver at lead. Together, the new lineup won the junior provincial title and represented Manitoba at the 2016 Canadian Junior Curling Championships. At junior nationals, the Ackland rink led Manitoba to a 7–3 record through the round robin and championship pools. They then faced New Brunswick's Justine Comeau in a tiebreaker, eliminating them from contention.

Back with Team Peterson, Njegovan won her first tour event at the 2016 Atkins Curling Supplies Classic where her team defeated Darcy Robertson 7–6 in the final. At the 2017 Manitoba Scotties Tournament of Hearts, Team Peterson finished with a 4–3 record, not enough to qualify for the playoff round.

During the 2017–18 season, Team Peterson won the Fort Garry Industries Bonspiel, beating out Katie Chappellaz in the final. The team also reached the semifinals of the Atkins Curling Supplies Classic and the quarterfinals of the MCT Championships. Despite their successes on tour, Team Peterson was unable to advance to the 2018 Manitoba Scotties Tournament of Hearts after losing out in their regional qualifiers.

After taking two seasons off, Njegovan returned during for the 2020–21 season with her new team of skip Abby Ackland, second Emilie Rafnson, lead Sara Oliver and alternate Brandi Forrest. The team played in two events during the abbreviated season, reaching the semifinals of both the Atkins Curling Supplies Classic and the MCT Cargill Curling Training Centre Fall Classic.

Personal life
Njegovan works as a registered psychiatric nurse RPN at Health Sciences Centre. Her brother is fellow curler Connor Njegovan and her sister-in-law is Selena Njegovan.

Teams

References

External links

1994 births
Canadian women curlers
Living people
Curlers from Winnipeg
Canadian nurses
Canadian women nurses